Meng Ong is a Singapore born filmmaker.  He began making movies at 16 and graduated from New York University Film School. Miss Wonton is his first feature-length film, premiering at the Sundance Film Festival 2001 in the American spectrum section.  He has also been selected as one of the “Directors to Watch” by filmfestivals.com.  It also won the prestigious PRIX FIPRESCI International Critics Prize at the Locarno Film Festival and showcased at other festivals like Busan International Film Festival and as the opening night film at the Bite the Mango film festival in UK.  The film has been released by United International Pictures in Singapore (2001) and at the Cinema Village in New York City (2002).  It has been released on video by Comstar.  In 2019, it was selected by Asian Film Archive for Korean Film Archive’s Asian Digitalization Project which awards films of cultural and historical significance.

Meng Ong’s second feature, “A Fantastic Ghost Wedding” (aka “A Chinese Ghost Wedding”) was selected for the Sundance Institute June Screenwriter’s Lab and the Taipei Golden Horse Promotion Project.  The film stars Hong Kong veteran actress Sandra Ng 吴君如 and Singapore's comedian/actor Mark Lee 李国皇。 Meng Ong was nominated Best New Asian Talent at the Hong Kong Asian Film Festival 2014.

For television, he directed and produced television for Channel 5 at Mediacorp Studios, Singapore.  He also executive produced, “Police and Thief”, one of the most successful English comedies on channel 5 which ran for six seasons.   He also directed the National Day telemovie, “This is My Home”.  In 2019, he directed "Fried Rice Paradise", a television adaptation of Dick Lee's musical for MM2 and Mediacorp, Channel 5.  In 2020, he directed "Titoudao", a TV adaptation of Goh Boon Teck's play for Oak3 films and Mediacorp channel 5.

In 2014, he was commissioned by Ministry of Defence, Singapore to direct a short film, “Hands” to commemorate Total Defence 30th anniversary.

His award winning short films and videos including, Waves of a Distant Shore, Chinadoll and Buddha’s Garden, have been shown at the Asian American Film Festival, Clermont Ferrand Short Film Festival, Philadelphia International Film Festival, the MIX Festival in New York, the Young ASEAN filmmakers Festival in Japan and more.  He is a multiple winner at the Silver Screen Awards at the Singapore International Film Festival including winner of two Best Director Awards.

He is currently an adjunct lecturer at Temasek Polytechnic, teaching Digital Film and Television.

Filmography

External links
  NY Times review of Miss Wonton

References

Singaporean film directors
Singaporean people of Chinese descent
American film directors of Singaporean descent
Living people
Year of birth missing (living people)